The IX District, also known as Länsiranta (Finnish; Väststranden in Swedish, meaning 'west bank'), is one of the central districts of Turku, Finland. As its alias suggests, it is located on the west side of the river Aura, between the Kakola hill in the neighbouring VIII District (Port Arthur). The district contains numerous museums and other cultural venues, such as the Turku conservatory.

The district has a population of 1,368 and an annual population growth rate of +0.14%. 11.83% of the district's population are under 15 years old, while 11.98% are over 65. The district's linguistic makeup is 90.76% Finnish, 6.13% Swedish, and 3.10% other.

See also
 Districts of Turku
 Districts of Turku by population

9